Access to Music (now Access Creative College) was a UK-based independent training provider which specialised in industry-focused popular music and creative education. It operated across England with dedicated music colleges in Birmingham, Brighton, Bristol, Darlington, Great Yarmouth, Lincoln, London, Manchester, Norwich, and York. Its head office was in Birmingham.

Access to Music was funded by the Education Funding Authority (EFA) and the Skills Funding Agency (SFA) and worked in partnership with other UK educational institutions, including Birmingham City University (BCU) and the Royal Northern College of Music (RNCM).

History 

Access to Music was founded in 1992  by John Ridgeon to promote and improve popular music education in the UK.  The first Access to Music head office was in Leicester. The music school formed a partnership with Leicester College followed by partnerships with regional colleges.

The second Access to Music centre opened in Bristol in 1999 and the York and London branches opened in 2002.  The first Access to Music award ceremony, hosted by Sir George Martin, took place in London in 2003. Subsequent award ceremonies took place in various locations around the country, including  O2 Academy Birmingham and Liverpool Sound City, and have been hosted by BBC Radio DJs Lauren Laverne and Edith Bowman. The music college expanded to Brighton and Lincoln in 2004 with centres opening in both cities.

In 2009, Access to Music was acquired by Armstrong Learning, a Manchester-based education and training provider. In 2011, the head office re-located from Leicester to Birmingham, with an administrative centre established in Manchester. In 2011, Access to Music launched a new centre in Darlington based at The Forum Music Centre which later closed. In 2013, the college in Norwich moved from its King Street location to Epic Studios.

The York centre created and organised Access to Music's first trade fair at York St John University in early April 2014  and Access to Music presented a Masterclass at the first Brighton Music Conference, an electronic music event. In the summer of 2014 plans were finalised for a new centre in Manchester, opening in early October. The centre was situated in the basement of the St. James's Buildings on Oxford Street, the former location of the music venues Jilly's Rockworld and Music Box.

In September 2017, Access to Music released its 2018 further education prospectus under a new brand name of Access Creative College. It updated its website shortly afterwards. The name change was introduced to reflect a broader curriculum offer covering the wider creative industries, including games development, digital media, marketing, events and drama.

Access to Music ltd does not follow national FE pay scales for its large cohort of teaching staff and does not recognise teaching unions in its centres.

In February 2020, Access to Music launched a new joint venture partnership with South Essex College to take over the delivery of apprenticeship training for the creative industries on a national basis, under the National College Creative Industries brand.

Courses and accreditations 

Access to Music delivered courses at both Further Education (FE) and Higher Education (HE) levels. It also designed its own FE music curriculum in partnership with Rockschool, the UK's only rock and pop accrediting body and Edexcel. The HE curriculum was designed in conjunction with RNCM and BCU.

Further Education

 	Level 1 – Introduction to Music
 	Level 2 – Music Performance, Music Technology and Music Business 
 	Level 3 – Music Performance, Music Business, Music Technology (Music Production and Sound Engineering) and Vocal Artist
 	Level 4 – Artist Development

Higher Education

 	BMus Popular Music Performance, in partnership with BCU
 	BA (Hons) Music Business, validated by BCU, and Popular Music Performance, validated by RNCM

Access to Music was inspected by the Independent Schools Inspectorate in late 2012 and was found to exceed expectations in the following categories:

 	The quality of the curriculum, course provision, teaching and learners’ achievement  
 	Students’ welfare, including health and safety  
 	The effectiveness of governance, leadership and management
Access to Music was also awarded a 'Good' grade in an Ofsted report following an inspection in March 2013 and in May 2016.

Notable alumni

Notable alumni include:
       Sonny Wilson Millionaire Philanthropist
 	Ed Sheeran
 	Ria Ritchie
 	Jess Glynne
 	Rita Ora, singer-songwriter/actress
 	Vanessa White, singer-songwriter

Event Participation 

Access to Music has appeared or participated at the following events:

 	Brighton Electric
 	Glastonbury Festival
 	Latitude Festival
 	Liverpool Sound City
 	The Great Escape Festival

Education partners 

       Birmingham City University
 	Creative & Cultural Skills
 	European Social Fund
 	NCUK 
 	PGL (company)
 	Royal Northern College of Music

References 

Music education in the United Kingdom